The  First expedition to Palembang  was a punitive expedition of the Royal Dutch East Indies Army to Palembang in 1819. The expedition ended in a failure for the Dutch.

See also
 Second expedition to Palembang

Sources
 1900. W.A. Terwogt. Het land van Jan Pieterszoon Coen. Geschiedenis van de Nederlanders in oost-Indië. P. Geerts. Hoorn
 1900. G. Kepper. Wapenfeiten van het Nederlands Indische Leger; 1816-1900. M.M. Cuvee, Den Haag.'
 1876. A.J.A. Gerlach. Nederlandse heldenfeiten in Oost Indë. Drie delen. Gebroeders

Royal Netherlands Army
Dutch conquest of Indonesia